Love Home Swap is a subscription-based, peer-to-peer holiday home exchange or home swapping website. Members of the website swap homes with each other, either simultaneously or using a points system. The company is based in London, United Kingdom. Love Home Swap was acquired by Travel + Leisure Co. (formerly Wyndham Worldwide Corporation) in August 2017.

History 
Love Home Swap was founded in 2011 by Debbie Wosskow OBE after being inspired by the film The Holiday featuring Kate Winslet and Cameron Diaz. The company was founded during a phase of rapid growth in the sharing economy or collaborative consumption space, of which Wosskow was a strong proponent.

 2014 Love Home Swap acquired 1st Home Exchange
 2015 Received first investment from Wyndham (now operating as Travel + Leisure Co.)
 2015 Acquired Dutch rival Home For Exchange
 August 2017 Love Home Swap was acquired by Travel + Leisure Co. for $53 million

External links

References 

Sharing economy